John Winthrop Noble (born Winfield Fernley Kutz; June 24, 1880 – September 10, 1946) was an American film director and screenwriter during the silent era.

Career
John Winthrop Noble was the professional name of Winfield Fernley Kutz (sometimes given as Fernley Winfield Kutz), born June 24, 1880, in Pottsville, Pennsylvania. He worked in various capacities with the Thanhouser Company from 1910 to 1912, assisting director Lucius J. Henderson and appearing in films including The Baseball Bug (1911) and The Poacher (1912). He worked briefly for Solax Studios, formed the short-lived Ryno Film Company with Clarkson Potter Ryttenberg in 1913, and directed films for the Ramo Company. In December 1913 he joined the staff of D. W. Griffith and became a director for the Mutual Film Corporation. Noble also worked for studios including the B. A. Rolfe Company (1914–16), Biograph Studios, Universal Pictures, Metro Pictures and Goldwyn Pictures.

Called and later credited as Jack Noble, he was known as Fernley Kutz at the time of his death September 10, 1946, at his home in Pottstown.

Filmography

Notes

References

External links
 
 
 
 

1880 births
1946 deaths
People from Pottstown, Pennsylvania
Film directors from Pennsylvania